The 1963 All-Ireland Intermediate Hurling Championship was the third staging of the All-Ireland hurling championship. The championship ended on 8 September 1963.

Carlow were the defending champions, however, they availed of their right to promotion to the All-Ireland Senior Hurling Championship and did not field a team. Tipperary won the title after defeating London by 1–10 to 1–7 in the final. Captain on the day Jackie Lanigan was representing his club Thurles Kickham's.

References

Intermediate
All-Ireland Intermediate Hurling Championship